Nicole Natalie Marrow ( Austin; born March 17, 1979), commonly known as Coco Austin, Coco, Coco Marie Austin, Coco Marie, and Coco-T, is an American television personality and actress. She has been married to rapper Ice-T since 2002.

Early life 
Austin was born on March 1979 in Tarzana, California, and raised in nearby Palos Verdes. She has Serbian ancestry through maternal grandparents born in Serbia. Austin has a younger sister named Kristy Williams and three younger brothers.  As a small child, her brother would mispronounce her name, saying "Cole Cole" or "Co-co" in place of "Nicole".  Eventually her family began addressing her as Coco. The family moved to Albuquerque, New Mexico, when she was 10. She grew up as a tomboy, riding all-terrain vehicles and playing football. Austin also began dancing during her childhood (jazz, tap and ballet).

Career 
At 18, Austin began specializing in swimsuit, lingerie and body modeling for calendars, catalogs and videos. In 1997, she appeared on her first magazine cover for Swimwear Illustrated. She won the 1998 Miss Ujena contest in Mexico. In 2001, Austin began working events and parties at the Playboy Mansion. She appeared in low-budget R-rated films, including Southwest Babes (2001), Desert Rose (2002), and The Dirty Monks (2004).

Austin has made guest appearances on  TV shows and specials including Hip-Hop Wives, the Comedy Central Roast of Flavor Flav, RuPaul's Drag Race 5, The Late Late Show with Craig Ferguson, The Dr. Oz Show, and Law & Order: Special Victims Unit.

She was featured in a layout in the March 2008 issue of Playboy magazine and had a role in the film Thira (a.k.a. Santorini Blue, which co-starred her husband, rapper-actor Ice-T). Austin appeared on NBC's game show Celebrity Family Feud on June 24, 2008 (with winnings donated to charity). She and Ice-T competed against Joan and Melissa Rivers.

Austin played the lead role of Bo Peep in the Las Vegas revue Peepshow from December 2012 to September 1, 2013, replacing Holly Madison in the role.

Austin and Ice-T starred in the reality television series Ice Loves Coco, which premiered June 12, 2011, on E!  The show ran for three seasons, ending in February 2014. After the show's cancelation, tabloids reported that Austin and her husband were preparing to launch another reality series under Ryan Seacrest's production company. She also made an appearance in rapper Lil' Kim's music video for her single "Go Awff" in 2019.

Personal life 

Austin was married to Mike Williams from 1999 to 2001. 

Austin and rapper-actor Tracy "Ice-T" Marrow were married in January 2002. They renewed their vows in Hollywood on June 4, 2011. In 2006, the couple made their home in a penthouse apartment they owned in North Bergen, New Jersey. In 2012, they began building a five-bedroom house in Edgewater, New Jersey, which was expected to be completed by the end of that year. The couple eventually moved into the home during 2018 and 2019. 

The couple had a daughter on November 28, 2015.

References

External links 

 
 

1979 births
Living people
21st-century American women
Actresses from Albuquerque, New Mexico
Actresses from New Jersey
Actresses from New Mexico
American people of Serbian descent
Television personalities from Los Angeles
American women television personalities
People from Edgewater, New Jersey
People from Tarzana, Los Angeles
People from North Bergen, New Jersey
Actresses from Los Angeles County, California
American female models
Female models from New Mexico
Female models from California
Female models from New Jersey